Munir Akram (born 2 December 1945) is a Pakistani diplomat currently serving for the second time as Permanent Representative of Pakistan to the United Nations. He had previously held the post from 2002 to 2008, during which time he also served two terms as President of the United Nations Security Council. On 23 July 2020 Akram was elected President of the United Nations Economic and Social Council, serving from July 2020 to July 2021.

Career
Akram received a Bachelors degree in law from the University of Karachi, before studying for a Masters degree in political science at the same institution. He cleared the elite Central Superior Services examinations in 1968 to enter public service. After mandatory training, he formally joined the Foreign Service of Pakistan in 1969, his first posting being as second secretary at Pakistan's Permanent Mission to the United Nations. Later, in addition to holding various positions at the Foreign Ministry, he served in several important diplomatic missions, including as Pakistan's ambassador to Japan (1982–1985) and to the European Union (1988–1992).

Akram served as Permanent Representative of Pakistan to the United Nations Office at Geneva from 1995 to 2002, before holding the same post in New York, where he served until 2008. He had reached superannuation in 2005, but was hired again on an extension contract. He was dismissed by the newly elected President, Asif Ali Zardari, in 2008 because of his disagreement over presenting the case of the assassination of Benazir Bhutto to the United Nations. He also served as President of the Security Council for two separate terms, in 2002 and 2004.

On 30 September 2019 Akram was reappointed as Permanent Representative to the United Nations in New York.

Akram is also a regular columnist for Pakistan's leading English daily newspaper, Dawn.

Charges of assault 
In 2003 Akram's then live-in girlfriend, Marijana Mihic, called the police to report him for violent assault against her. Her report included charges of previous incidents of violence. While the New York Police Department did not arrest Akram owing to his diplomatic immunity, the case was pursued by the New York County District Attorney, Robert Morgenthau, with the backing of Majorie Tiven, sister of the then Mayor, Michael Bloomberg. However, a month later, in February 2003, the District Attorney's office dropped the investigation.

Affiliations
Akram is an advisory board member of the Counter Extremism Project. He is also a former board member of Allis-Chalmers Energy, serving at the company between September 2008 and June 2009.

References

External links
Munir Akram CV at Pak Mission to UN
Munir Akram CV at ECOSOC

1945 births
Living people
Permanent Representatives of Pakistan to the United Nations
University of Karachi alumni
Ambassadors of Pakistan to the European Union
Ambassadors of Pakistan to Belgium
Ambassadors of Pakistan to Luxembourg
People from Karachi
Ambassadors of Pakistan to Japan